A gas cracker is any device that splits the molecules in a gas or liquid, usually by electrolysis, into atoms. The end product is usually a gas. A hydrocracker is an example of a gas cracker. In nature, molecules are split often, such as in food digestion and microbial digestion activity. A gas cracker device splits the molecule at a rate much greater than that normally found in nature. In science and industry, gas crackers are used to separate two or more elements in a molecule. This is not to be confused with the splitting of the nucleus (nuclear power).

Gas cracker
Petrochemicals are usually manufactured in large scale from petroleum feed stocks using fluid catalytic cracking. Naphtha, natural gas, refinery off-gas and gas from cokers and thermal crackers are good sources. Thus natural gas is one of the most wanted feed stocks for petrochemicals production. The thermal cracking of natural gas proceeds at very high temperature resulting in  olefins (Mostly ethylene/propylene). The temperature in a gas cracker exceeds 1000°C. For ultimate decomposition of gas into elements more than 1500 °C is required. Thus, acetylene/carbon black production encounters such high temperatures. Usually oxy-combustion methods are used for attaining such high temperatures. BASF burners/Kellog burners are available in the market.

Other methods
Further electro cracking or plasma cracking methods are also available.

References

See also
 Plasma polymerization
 Pyrolysis
 Gas-phase ion chemistry

Sources 
 Fahad H. Falqi, 2009, The Miracle of Petrochemicals: Olefins Industry : an In-depth Look at Steam Crackers.
 Herman F. Mark, 2013, Encyclopedia of Polymer Science and Technology, Concise.
 William L. Leffler, 2014, Natural Gas Liquids: A Nontechnical Guide.

Citations

Electrolysis
Gas technologies